Wapenamanda Airport is an airport in Wapenamanda, Enga Province, Papua New Guinea .

Airlines and destinations

Airports in Papua New Guinea
Enga Province